In probability theory and statistics, the normal-inverse-gamma distribution (or Gaussian-inverse-gamma distribution) is a four-parameter family of multivariate continuous probability distributions. It is the conjugate prior of a normal distribution with unknown mean and variance.

Definition
Suppose

 
has a normal distribution with mean  and variance , where

 
has an inverse gamma distribution. Then  
has a normal-inverse-gamma distribution, denoted as

( is also used instead of )

The normal-inverse-Wishart distribution is a generalization of the normal-inverse-gamma distribution that is defined over multivariate random variables.

Characterization

Probability density function

 

For the multivariate form where  is a  random vector,

 

where  is the determinant of the  matrix . Note how this last equation reduces to the first form if  so that  are scalars.

Alternative parameterization 
It is also possible to let  in which case the pdf becomes

 

In the multivariate form, the corresponding change would be to regard the covariance matrix  instead of its inverse  as a parameter.

Cumulative distribution function

Properties

Marginal distributions

Given  as above,  by itself follows an inverse gamma distribution:

while  follows a t distribution with  degrees of freedom. 

Summation

Scaling
Suppose

Proof: To prove this let  and fix  .

Exponential family

Information entropy

Kullback–Leibler divergence

Measures difference between two distributions.

Maximum likelihood estimation

Posterior distribution of the parameters 
See the articles on normal-gamma distribution and conjugate prior.

Interpretation of the parameters 
See the articles on normal-gamma distribution and conjugate prior.

Generating normal-inverse-gamma random variates 
Generation of random variates is straightforward:
 Sample  from an inverse gamma distribution with parameters  and 
 Sample  from a normal distribution with mean  and variance

Related distributions 
 The normal-gamma distribution is the same distribution parameterized by precision rather than variance
 A generalization of this distribution which allows for a multivariate mean and a completely unknown positive-definite covariance matrix  (whereas in the multivariate inverse-gamma distribution the covariance matrix is regarded as known up to the scale factor ) is the normal-inverse-Wishart distribution

See also 
 Compound probability distribution

References 

  Denison, David G. T. ; Holmes, Christopher C.; Mallick, Bani K.; Smith, Adrian F. M. (2002) Bayesian Methods for Nonlinear Classification and Regression, Wiley. 
  Koch, Karl-Rudolf (2007) Introduction to Bayesian Statistics (2nd Edition), Springer. 

Continuous distributions
Multivariate continuous distributions
Normal distribution